A by-election was held for the British House of Commons constituency of Leominster on 18 March 1912.  The seat had become vacant on the resignation of the Conservative Member of Parliament Sir James Rankin, 1st Baronet, who had held the seat since the 1910 general election, with a majority of 831, increased to 1,169 in the election of November that year.

The Conservative candidate, Captain Henry FitzHerbert Wright, was returned unopposed.

See also
Leominster (UK Parliament constituency)
List of United Kingdom by-elections

1912 elections in the United Kingdom
1912 in England
Unopposed by-elections to the Parliament of the United Kingdom (need citation)
By-elections to the Parliament of the United Kingdom in Herefordshire constituencies
Leominster
20th century in Herefordshire